The NWA Louisiana Tag Team Championship was a professional wrestling tag team championship in NWA Tri-State. A secondary title after NWA Tri-State Tag Team Championship, and complementing the NWA Louisiana Heavyweight Championship, it was one of many state tag team championships recognized by the National Wrestling Alliance.

Some reigns were held by champions using a ring name, while others used their real name. There have been a total of 31 recognized individual champions and 18 recognized teams, who have had a combined 23 official reigns. The first champions were Frankie Kovacs and Gino Angelo, and the final champions were "Cowboy" Bill Watts and Buck Robley. At 175 days, The Assassin and The Angel's first and only reign was the longest. The teams of Danny Little Bear and Kit Fox, Frank Dalton and Danny Little Bear, and The Blue Demons are tied for the shortest reigns at 7 days each.

The team with the most reigns is The Blue Demons (Blue Demon #1 and Blue Demon #2) with three. Danny Little Bear has the most individual reigns with four. The following is a chronological list of teams that have been Louisiana Tag Team Champions by ring name.

Key

Title history

List of top combined reigns

By team

By wrestler

Footnotes

References
General

Specific

National Wrestling Alliance championships
Tag team wrestling championships
National Wrestling Alliance state wrestling championships
Professional wrestling in Louisiana